The Kandahar Bilingual Rock Inscription, also known as the Kandahar Edict of Ashoka and less commonly as the Chehel Zina Edict, is an inscription in the Greek and Aramaic languages that dates back to 260 BCE and was carved by the Mauryan emperor Ashoka at Chehel Zina, a mountainous outcrop near Kandahar, Afghanistan. It is the among the earliest-known edicts of Ashoka, having been inscribed around the 8th year of his reign, and precedes all of his other inscriptions, including the Minor Rock Edicts and Barabar Caves in India and the Major Rock Edicts. This early inscription was written exclusively in the Greek and Aramaic languages. It was discovered below a  layer of rubble in 1958 during an excavation project around Kandahar, and is designated as KAI 279.

It is sometimes considered to be a part of Ashoka's Minor Rock Edicts (consequently dubbed "Minor Rock Edict No. 4"), in contrast to his Major Rock Edicts, which contain portions or the totality of his edicts from 1–14. The Kandahar Edict of Ashoka is one of two ancient inscriptions in Afghanistan that contain Greek writing, with the other being the Kandahar Greek Inscription, which is written exclusively in the Greek language. Chehel Zina, the mountainous outcrop where the edicts were discovered, makes up the western side of the natural bastion of the ancient Greek city of Alexandria Arachosia as well as the Old City of modern-day Kandahar.

The edict remains on the mountainside that it was discovered on. According to the Italian archaeologist Umberto Scerrato, "the block lies at the eastern base of the little saddle between the two craggy hills below the peak on which the celebrated Cehel Zina of Babur are cut". A cast of the inscription is present in the National Museum of Afghanistan in Kabul. In the Kandahar Edict, Ashoka, a patron of Buddhism, advocates the adoption of piety (using the Greek-language term Eusebeia for the Indian concept of Dharma) to the Greek community of Afghanistan.

Background
Greek communities lived in the northwest of the Mauryan empire, currently in Pakistan, notably ancient Gandhara near the current Pakistani capital of Islamabad, and in the region of Arachosia, nowadays in Southern Afghanistan, following the conquest and the colonization efforts of Alexander the Great around 323 BCE. These communities therefore seem to have been still significant in the area of Afghanistan during the reign of Ashoka, about 70 years after Alexander.

Content

Ashoka proclaims his faith, 10 years after the violent beginning of his reign, and affirms that living beings, human or animal, cannot be killed in his realm. In the Hellenistic part of the Edict, he translates the Dharma he advocates by "Piety"   εὐσέβεια, Eusebeia, in Greek. The usage of Aramaic reflect the fact that Aramaic (the so-called Official Aramaic) had been the official language of the Achaemenid Empire which had ruled in those parts until the conquests of Alexander the Great. The Aramaic is not purely Aramaic, but seems to incorporate some elements of Iranian. According to D.D.Kosambi, the Aramaic is not an exact translation of the Greek, and it seems rather that both were translated separately from an original text in Magadhi, the common official language of India at the time, used on all the other Edicts of Ashoka in Indian language, even in such linguistically distinct areas as Kalinga. It is written in Aramaic alphabet.

This inscription is actually rather short and general in content, compared to most Major Rock Edicts of Ashoka, including the other inscription in Greek of Ashoka in Kandahar, the Kandahar Greek Edict of Ashoka, which contains long portions of the 12th and 13th edicts, and probably contained much more since it was cut off at the beginning and at the end.

Implications
The proclamation of this Edict in Kandahar is usually taken as proof that Ashoka had control over that part of Afghanistan, presumably after Seleucos had ceded this territory to Chandragupta Maurya in their 305 BCE peace agreement. The Edict also shows the presence of a sizable Greek population in the area, but it also shows the lingering importance of Aramaic, several decades after the fall of the Achaemenid Empire. At the same epoch, the Greeks were firmly established in the newly created Greco-Bactrian kingdom under the reign of Diodotus I, and particularly in the border city of Ai-Khanoum, not far away in the northern part of Afghanistan.

According to Sircar, the usage of Greek in the Edict indeed means that the message was intended for the Greeks living in Kandahar, while the usage of Aramaic was intended for the Iranian populations of the Kambojas.

Transcription
The Greek and Aramaic versions vary somewhat, and seem to be rather free interpretations of an original text in Prakrit. The Aramaic text clearly recognizes the authority of Ashoka with expressions such as "our Lord, king Priyadasin", "our lord, the king", suggesting that the readers were indeed the subjects of Ashoka, whereas the Greek version remains more neutral with the simple expression "King Ashoka".

Greek (transliteration)
δέκα ἐτῶν πληρη[ ... ]ων βασι[λ]εὺς
Πιοδασσης εὐσέβεια[ν ἔδ]ε[ι]ξεν τοῖς ἀν-
θρώποις, καὶ ἀπὸ τούτου εὐσεβεστέρους
τοὺς ἀνθρώπους ἐποίησεν καὶ πάντα
εὐθηνεῖ κατὰ πᾶσαν γῆν• καὶ ἀπέχεται
βασιλεὺς τῶν ἐμψύχων καὶ οἱ λοιποὶ δὲ
ἀνθρωποι καὶ ὅσοι θηρευταὶ ἤ αλιείς
βασιλέως πέπαυνται θηρεύοντες καὶ
εἲ τινες ἀκρατεῖς πέπαυνται τῆς ἀκρα-
σίας κατὰ δύναμιν, καὶ ἐνήκοοι πατρὶ
καὶ μητρὶ καὶ τῶν πρεσβυτέρων παρὰ
τὰ πρότερον καὶ τοῦ λοιποῦ λῶιον
καὶ ἄμεινον κατὰ πάντα ταῦτα
ποιοῦντες διάξουσιν.

English (translation of the Greek)
Ten years (of reign) having been completed, King
Piodasses made known (the doctrine of)
Piety (εὐσέβεια, Eusebeia) to men; and from this moment he has made
men more pious, and everything thrives throughout
the whole world. And the king abstains from (killing)
living beings, and other men and those who (are)
huntsmen and fishermen of the king have desisted
from hunting. And if some (were) intemperate, they
have ceased from their intemperance as was in their
power; and obedient to their father and mother and to
the elders, in opposition to the past also in the future,
by so acting on every occasion, they will live better
and more happily."

Aramaic (in Hebrew alphabet, stylized form of the Aramaic alphabet)

English (translation of the Aramaic)
Ten years having passed (?). It so happened (?) that our lord, king Priyadasin, became the institutor of Truth, 
Since then, evil diminished among all men and all misfortunes (?) lie caused to disappear; and [there is] peace as well as joy in the whole earth. 
And, moreover, [there is] this in regard to food: for our lord, the king, [only] a few 
[animals] are killed; having seen this, all men have given up [the slaughter of animals]; even (?) those men who catch fish (i.e. the fishermen) are subject to prohibition. 
Similarly, those who were without restraint have ceased to be without restraint. 
And obedience to mother and to father and to old men [reigns] in conformity with the obligations imposed by fate on each [person]. 
And there is no Judgement for all the pious men, 
This [i.e. the practice of Law] has been profitable to all men and will be more profitable [in future].

Other inscriptions in Greek in Kandahar

The other well-known Greek inscription, the Kandahar Greek Edict of Ashoka, was found 1.5 kilometers to the south of the Bilingual Rock Inscription, in the ancient city of Old Kandahar (known as Zor Shar in Pashto, or Shahr-i-Kona in Dari), Kandahar, in 1963. It is thought that Old Kandahar was founded in the 4th century BCE by Alexander the Great, who gave it the Ancient Greek name Αλεξάνδρεια Aραχωσίας (Alexandria of Arachosia). The Edict is a Greek version of the end of the 12th Edicts (which describes moral precepts) and the beginning of the 13th Edict (which describes the King's remorse and conversion after the war in Kalinga). This inscription does not use another language in parallel. It is a plaque of limestone, which probably had belonged to a building, and its size is 45x69.5 cm. The beginning and the end of the fragment are lacking, which suggests the inscription was original significantly longer, and may have included all fourteen of Ashoka's Edicts, as in several other locations in India. The Greek language used in the inscription is of a very high level and displays philosophical refinement. It also displays an in-depth understanding of the political language of the Hellenic world in the 3rd century BCE. This suggest the presence of a highly cultured Greek presence in Kandahar at that time.

Two other inscriptions in Greek are known at Kandahar. One is a dedication by a Greek man who names himself "son of Aristonax" (3rd century BCE). The other is an elegiac composition by  Sophytos son of Naratos (2nd century BCE).

See also
 List of Edicts of Ashoka
 Edicts of Ashoka
 Greco-Buddhism
 The Greek-Aramaic inscription of Julius Aurelius Zenobius in the Great Colonnade at Palmyra.

References

Sources
 

3rd-century BC works
1958 archaeological discoveries
Archaeological discoveries in Afghanistan
Edicts of Ashoka
Kandahar
Greek inscriptions
Aramaic inscriptions
KAI inscriptions
Multilingual texts